Marva Jean Cooks II (born August 28, 1975), better known by her stage name Marvaless, is an American rapper from Sacramento, California.

Career 
In 1992, a year after finishing high school, Cooks got together with C-Bo to record her debut album, Ghetto Blues, through AWOL Records. Successive solo releases were Just Marvaless (1995), Wiccked (1996), Fearless (1998), and Ghetto Blues 2001 (2001). During this time, Cooks also made a series of guest appearances on records by acts including 2Pac, Conscious Daughters, Mac Mall, Master P, Mac Dre, and AWOL label mates Lunasicc and C-Bo. She also performed with artists including Ice Cube, Biggie Smalls, Do or Die, and Redman.

In 2003 she returned to the scene with Bonnie and Clyde, a collaboration album with Messy Marv, followed by another collaboration, 3 Da Hard Way, with The Jacka and Husalah of Mob Figaz in 2005. She followed with her next solo album Ready Made the same year.  Her most recent album, Queen of The Mob, was released in 2010 and she is planning to release another solo album, Marva Jean, with Legasi Records. She also featured in the album "A Female Grind" by Thugg Miss in 2013.

Discography

Studio albums

Collaboration albums
 Bonnie and Clyde with Messy Marv (2003)
 3 Da Hard Way with Husalah and The Jacka (2005)

Extended plays

Guest appearances

References

External links 
 Marvaless on Discogs
 [ Marvaless] on allmusic
 Marvaless on iTunes
 Marvaless on Reverbnation
 
 
 

1973 births
Living people
21st-century American rappers
21st-century American women musicians
African-American women rappers
American women rappers
Gangsta rappers
G-funk artists
Rappers from Sacramento, California
Rappers from the San Francisco Bay Area
Underground rappers
21st-century African-American women
21st-century African-American musicians
20th-century African-American people
20th-century African-American women
21st-century women rappers